Donald Washington Sr. (1930December 1, 2009), was an American jazz tenor saxophonist.

Washington was born in West Philadelphia and raised in Southwest Philadelphia. He graduated from Murrell Dobbins Career and Technical Education High School in 1948 and was a two-sport athlete, taking up swimming and basketball. From 1965 through 1990, he worked for Food Fair Services as a warehouse attendant. While there, he won trophies and awards on the company's amateur boxing team. But jazz was always his life and his passion. He studied at private and public institutions, starting to play the saxophone as an elder statesman on Philadelphia's jazz scene since the late 1960s to the mid-1980s.

As a leader, Washington founded the Marlboro Men, a group that toured Haiti, Jamaica and the Virgin Islands. He also performed with Donald Byrd, Jerry Butler, Nat King Cole, Sammy Davis Jr., B.B. King, Diana Ross, Neil Sedaka and Horace Silver.

When not traveling, Washington jammed regularly in Saturday Nights at Natalie's Lounge in West Philadelphia. His students included Grover Washington Jr., George Howard.

Washington was married twice and had nine children from his first marriage. He died on December 1, 2009 in Haddon Heights, New Jersey at the age of 79, following complications from lung cancer.

References

External links
All About Jazz
The Dead Rock Stars Club

1930 births
2009 deaths
Musicians from Philadelphia
American jazz musicians
American jazz saxophonists
American male saxophonists
Deaths from cancer in New Jersey
Deaths from lung cancer
Jazz tenor saxophonists
20th-century American saxophonists
Jazz musicians from Pennsylvania
20th-century American male musicians
American male jazz musicians